James Keays (9 September 194613 June 2014) was a Scottish-born Australian musician who fronted the rock band The Masters Apprentices as singer-songwriter, guitarist and harmonica-player from 1965 to 1972 and subsequently had a solo career. He also wrote for a music newspaper, Go-Set, as its Adelaide correspondent in 1970 and its London correspondent in 1973.

The Masters Apprentices had Top 20 hits on the Go-Set National Singles Charts with "Undecided", "Living in a Child's Dream", "5:10 Man", "Think about Tomorrow Today", "Turn Up Your Radio" and "Because I Love You". The band reformed periodically, including in 1987 to 1988 and again subsequently. Keays, as a member of the Masters Apprentices, was inducted into the ARIA Hall of Fame in 1998. As a solo artist he issued the albums The Boy from the Stars (December 1974), Red on the Meter (October 1983), Pressure Makes Diamonds (1993), Resonator (2006) and Dirty, Dirty (2012).

He published his memoirs, His Master's Voice: The Masters Apprentices: The Bad Boys of Sixties Rock 'n' Roll, in 1999. From 2000, he performed in Cotton Keays & Morris alongside other former 1960s artists Darryl Cotton and Russell Morris. In July 2007, Keays was diagnosed with myeloma, which caused his kidneys to fail. By 2009 the cancer was in remission after chemotherapy and stem-cell transplants. However, he died in 2014 from pneumonia due to complications resulting from his cancer at age 67.

Early years
Keays was born on 9 September 1946 in Glasgow, Scotland, where his unwed mother put him up for adoption at six months old. He was adopted by James Keays Sr. (born 7 November 1916) and Jessie Cameron (née Caldwell) Keays (born 16 February 1915), a childless couple from Clydebank. They migrated to Australia on RMS Asturias, leaving Southampton on 5 September 1951, four days before he turned five. They settled in Beaumont, a suburb of Adelaide.

He attended Burnside Primary School and then Norwood High School. Keays played Australian rules football up to under-17s and golf—a passion shared with his father. His interest in rock music began when he heard "Rip It Up" by Little Richard and "Great Balls of Fire" by Jerry Lee Lewis on a school friend's turntable when he was 11.

The Mustangs
The Mustangs were a surf music instrumental, dance band formed in Adelaide in 1964 with Mick Bower on rhythm guitar, Rick Morrison on lead guitar, Brian Vaughton on drums and Gavin Webb on bass guitar. After the Beatles toured Australia, the Mustangs changed styles and advertised for a lead singer. Keays was the successful applicant. After he joined, the band played one set of instrumental covers of the Shadows and the Ventures followed by a second set of originals in the beat style with Keays on vocals.

The Masters Apprentices

In late 1965, the Mustangs with Keays aboard renamed themselves the Masters Apprentices (deliberately omitting the apostrophe). Bower supplied the name because "we are apprentices to the masters of the blues—Chuck Berry, Bo Diddley, Jimmy Reed, Elmore James and Robert Johnson". Early original songs were largely written (or co-written) by Bower, including Top 20 hit singles, "Undecided" and "Living in a Child's Dream". Ian "Molly" Meldrum of Go-Set, the teen pop music newspaper, declared that they had "made the grade".

Whilst a member of the Masters Apprentices, Keays was one of hundreds of potential national service conscripts whose 20th birthday, 9 September, was picked in a 1966 ballot. He was able to legally avoid the draft by signing with the Citizens Military Force (CMF, later renamed the Army Reserve) and eluded a "short back and sides" haircut with the aid of a girlfriend, who pinned his long hair up under his slouch hat whenever he attended CMF sessions. By February 1967 the band had relocated to Melbourne. Late that year he began taking the illegal psychedelic drug, LSD. After Bower left the group in September 1967, because of a severe nervous breakdown, Keays became the de facto leader, while various line-up changes followed. Keays chose their "velvet, satin and floral-print psychedelic gear", which they wore on stage and for photo shoots.

In January 1968, Colin Burgess (ex-the Haze) joined on drums, followed by Doug Ford (ex-the Missing Links, Running Jumping Standing Still) on lead guitar. Keays and Ford began working as a song writing team, beginning with "Brigette", released as a single in June, which peaked into the Top 40. Glenn Wheatley (from Brisbane's blues group Bay City Union) had joined on rhythm guitar by May and later took over bass guitar.

The Masters Apprentices became the "bad-boys of rock", Keays was interviewed for Go-Set by staff reporter, Lily Brett, and the 'expose' was printed on 17 July 1968, headlined "Sex is Thrust upon Us", the article and its follow-up, "Whose Breasts Are Best?", revealed aspects of the bacchanalian scene where female groupies were called band molls: 

The "bad-boy" publicity also frustrated their manager, Darryl Sambell, who had planned to market them as a wholesome teen combo. Keays stated that there was a backlash from the interview: the roadway outside his flat in East St Kilda was daubed with the slogan "Band Moll's Paradise" in one-metre high letters, threats of physical beatings were made by male audience members and press claims that they were "sex maniacs" were regularly printed. During 1969 the band switched to wearing leather stage outfits—it was routine for the band to have their clothes and hair literally torn off by frantic fans, and the cost of buying expensive stage clothes which were being shredded nightly was sending them broke. But the leather gear—which resisted even the most ardent fans—provided them with their longest-wearing outfits in years, and Keays maintained that it saved them thousands of dollars.

In April 1970, EMI released the group's most popular single, "Turn Up Your Radio", co-written by Keays and Ford, produced by Howard Gable, and engineered by Ern Rose. It was recorded at a late-night session and Keays later recounted that he was so drunk when he recorded his vocals that he had to be held up to the microphone. The song was deliberately designed to be loud and offensive, and was intended as the final nail in the coffin to their ill-conceived teenybopper image. It was released just before the start of the 1970 radio ban—a major dispute between commercial radio stations and record companies—which resulted in the banning of many major-label releases. Despite little commercial radio airplay, the song raced up the charts and peaked at No. 7 nationally. During that year Keays was the Adelaide-based correspondent for Go-Set.

Keays and Ford co-wrote four of the band's Top 20 hits with "5:10 Man" (No. 16 on the Go-Set National Top 40 Charts, 1969), "Think About Tomorrow Today" (No. 12, 1969), "Turn Up Your Radio" (No. 7, 1970) and "Because I Love You" (No. 12, 1971). Keays and Ford also co-wrote "Quicksand" which was issued as a single by Adelaide-based blues group, The Expression, in June 1970. Australian musicologist, Ian McFarlane, declared that the track "ranks as one of the most astonishing hard guitar/psychedelic singles of the period". Keays and Ford co-wrote "St John's Wood" (mid-1970) for Brisbane-formed group, the Sect, which had relocated to Melbourne in late 1969 and signed with the same booking agency. From July 1970 the Masters Apprentices had relocated to the United Kingdom where they tried to break into the local market but they disbanded in 1972 without achieving any UK charting.

Solo and with Southern Cross
After leaving the Masters Apprentices in early 1972, Keays returned to Australia and completed promotional duties for their just released single, "Love Is", which did not chart. He established a talent brokerage, Rock on Agency. Keays compèred the Meadows Technicolor Fair in Adelaide in January that year. He wrote an article about the festival for Go-Set, which was printed to coincide with its first day. He followed by compèring the Mulwala Festival in April. According to Daily Planets Dean Moriarty the latter festival's promoters had shown "little respect for artists and audience", Keays and his wife "spent a night ... on the ground in the rain".

From late March 1973 he played the role of "The Lover" in the Australian version of the Who's rock opera, Tommy. The Melbourne performance was broadcast in early April on TV station HSV-7. Also during that year Keays wrote for Go-Set as their London correspondent, providing "News and gossip from within the music industry". In January 1974, Keays compèred the fourth annual Sunbury Pop Festival. He then oversaw the Masters Apprentices' compilation album Now That It's Over (October 1974), drawing on their later career. He designed its cover, with liner notes written by Howard Lindley, a freelance journalist and film maker. Lindley had been working on a film about the group before he committed suicide in 1972. EMI released a track from the compilation as single by The Masters Apprentices, "Rio de Camero", in August 1974, which garnered radio airplay but it did not chart.

In December 1974, Keays released his debut solo album, Boy from the Stars, also on EMI. It was an ambitious concept LP with the science fiction theme of an alien arriving on Earth to warn of the misuse of power sources. For the album, which was produced by Ian Miller, Keays wrote all the lyrics and most of the music. Session musicians included: David Allardice on piano, James Black on guitar, Geoff Bridgeford on drums, Joe Creighton on bass guitar, Mick Elliot on guitar, Dennis Garcia on keyboard, Billy Green on guitar, Marcia Hines on backing vocals and Lobby Loyde on guitar. The Canberra Times Tony Catterall felt the "main concept ... has been done to death" while musically it showed a "lack of expertise ... while striving for effect succeeds only in producing a sea of mud that obscures Keays's lyrics and drowns the individual instruments in a swirl of uninteresting sound". Whereas McFarlane declared it was "put together with a great deal of skill and attention to detail".

His first single, "Kid's Blues", was also released in December. Some tracks from Boy from the Stars were performed at the final Sunbury Pop Festival in January 1975, by his all-star backing group, Jim Keays Band. They were joined on-stage by Wheatley, recently returned from the UK, in their last performance together for over ten years. As a member of The Masters Apprentices, Keays had endured rip-offs, where promoters had made considerable profits while they had received little payment. At Sunbury 1975 Keays and his band were one of few Australian groups to be paid for appearing—Keays had wisely arranged an outside sponsor—low attendance and the huge $60,000 fee paid to head-lining group, Deep Purple, meant that few of the other Australian acts were paid, and the festival organisers went into liquidation soon after. His second single, "The Boy from the Stars", was released in February.

Keays provided lead vocals for Cybotron's Steve Maxwell Von Braund's debut solo album, Monster Planet (1975). He followed with a single-only release, "Give It Up", an anti-drug song, and subsequently toured with the line-up of Allardice, Bridgeford, Creighton, Elliot and Garcia in his backing band. Late that year he formed Jim Keays' Southern Cross with Elliot and Rick Brewer (ex-Zoot) on drums, Rex Bullen (Bakery) on keyboards, George Cross (Clydehouse) on bass guitar. They reworked, "Undecided" which was issued as a single for CBS Records in December 1975, by then the line-up had changed to Peter Laffy (Fox) on guitar, Ron Robinson on bass guitar and John Swan (Fraternity) on drums.

Keays co-produced an album, Riding High (February 1976), by Melbourne-based hard rock group Freeway, which Catterall opined had "a serious identity problem ... not knowing if it's the Allman Brothers Band, Grinderswitch or Lynard Skynard, it also has tendencies toward sounding like Bad Company and the Doobie Brothers"; while Keays work is criticised as he "does tend to overuse" synthesisers. In July 1977, he teamed up with Phil Manning (ex-Bay City Union, Chain) on guitar to form Manning/Keays Band. The line-up included Peter Cuddily on bass guitar (ex-Space Waltz); John Grant on keyboards (ex-Freeway); Andrew Kay on violin and keyboards; and Robert Ross on drums. The band started recording an album but Keays left the project, which continued as Manning. Also that year Keays relocated to the United States' West Coast, where he lived for almost two years.

By 1978 he formed another version of Jim Keays Band with Black, Robinson, and David Rowe on drums. Black was replaced by John Moon (Buster Brown) on guitar and Geoff Spooner on guitar. Renamed as The Keays in 1979, his band was Moon, Peter Marshall on bass guitar, Nigel Rough on drums (Loose Trousers) and Bruce Stewart on guitar (Loose Trousers). This line-up released the single, "Lucifer Street" in 1980. Stewart became seriously ill and the album, Red on the Meter, was delayed until October 1983. It was produced by John L Sayers (Radio Birdman, Jimmy Little, Mi-Sex). Keays worked as a radio DJ from 1983 to 1987, and was also a producer of Melbourne music program, Performance which was renamed as Night Life, during 1984 to 1985. Keays and Moon joined as guest musicians with The Incredible Penguins (containing future band mate Wayne Mathews) in 1985, for a cover of "Happy Xmas (War Is Over)", in a charity project for research on Fairy penguins, which peaked at No. 10 on the Australian Kent Music Report in December.

In 1987 he signed with Virgin Records in UK and recorded another version of "Undecided" with Andy Scott (Sweet) on guitar and produced by Craig Leon. The single was released in July, followed by a cover of Count Five's "Psychotic Reaction" in October. Keays participated in various reunions of The Masters Apprentices from later 1987. He released his next solo album, Pressure Makes Diamonds, co-produced with producer, composer and guitarist, Frank Sablotny (a.k.a. Frank Tayla) in 1993 on Gemstone Records. It included the track, "Waiting for the Big One", co-written by Keays and Sablotny. In 1998, Australian Recording Industry Association (ARIA) inducted The Masters Apprentices into the Hall of Fame. Keays wrote his memoirs, His Master's Voice: The Masters Apprentices: The Bad Boys of Sixties Rock 'n' Roll, in 1999. Wheatley also published his memoirs, Paper Paradise: Confessions of a Rock 'n' Roll Survivor, later that year.

From 2000, he toured periodically as a member of Cotton Keays & Morris with 1960s artists Darryl Cotton from Adelaide's Zoot and Russell Morris from Melbourne's Somebody's Image.

The ABC-TV series, Long Way to the Top, was broadcast in August 2001. Keays featured in "Episode 2: Ten Pound Rocker 1963–1968" where he discussed the UK migrant influence on The Masters Apprentices early work and "Undecided"; and in "Episode 3: Billy Killed the Fish 1968–1973" where he described pioneering pub rock and the band's groupies.

The TV series inspired the Long Way to the Top national concert tour during August–September 2002, which included a range of Australian acts of the 1950s, 1960s and 1970s. The classic line-up of Burgess, Ford, Keays and Wheatley reformed The Masters Apprentices although Wheatley only performed for a couple of the concerts and was substituted on bass guitar by his son, Tim Wheatley. Performances of "Because I Love You" and "Turn Up Your Radio" at the final Sydney concert, as well as an interview with promoter, Amanda Pelman, feature on the associated DVD, Long Way to the Top: Live in Concert released in 2002.

Keays continued with Cotton Keays & Morris tours and reunions of The Masters Apprentices. His next solo album, Resonator, was released in 2006 on the Liberation Blue label. In 2007 he reflected on his longevity as a performer "I guess I'm a bit of a Peter Pan ... If you've still got the passion and can still do it. Age is no barrier". His next solo album, Dirty, Dirty, appeared in 2012. In May 2014 he performed at Crown Casino in Melbourne. Jim Keays died on 13 June 2014, 3 months short of his 68th birthday. Keays had been working on his next album, Age Against the Machine, prior to his death.

Personal life
Early in 1970, Keays married his pregnant girlfriend Vicki in Plympton, South Australia. They had a son. In 1981, the couple separated; Keays is grandfather to James' son, Will. Keays' adoptive parents, James and Jessie Keays, both died in 1975. His biological mother, Nancy (born 13 June), re-established contact with him in 1984. Keays and his second wife, Karin, were parents of two daughters and a son who was born on 1 November 2003, but only survived for six hours.

Declining health and death 

In July 2007 Jim Keays was diagnosed with myeloma, which caused his kidneys to fail. He was put on dialysis and chemotherapy, then he had stem-cell transplants and returned to performing with Cotton Keays & Morris. As of February 2009, he had been in remission. However, he died on 13 June 2014 – his mother's birthday – from pneumonia due to complications resulting from his cancer, at a Melbourne hospital.

Bibliography
 Note: limited preview for on-line version.

Discography
The Masters Apprentices

Studio albums

Singles

Cotton Keays & Morris

Awards and nominations

EG Awards / Music Victoria Awards
The EG Awards (known as Music Victoria Awards since 2013) are an annual awards night celebrating Victorian music. They commenced in 2006.

|-
| EG Awards of 2012
| Dirty, Dirty
| Best Album
| 
|-

Go-Set Pop Poll
The Go-Set Pop Poll was coordinated by teen-oriented pop music newspaper, Go-Set and was established in February 1966 and conducted an annual poll during 1966 to 1972 of its readers to determine the most popular personalities.

|-
| 1970
| himself 
| Best Composer
| style="background:silver;"| 2nd
|-
| 1971
| himself 
| Best Composer
| 5th
|-

References

General
  Note: limited preview for on-line version.
 
  Note: Archived [on-line] copy has limited functionality.

Specific

External links
  for The Masters Apprentices, Jim Keays and Cotton Keays & Morris

1946 births
2014 deaths
Australian pop singers
Australian singer-songwriters
British adoptees
Deaths from cancer in Victoria (Australia)
Deaths from multiple myeloma
Deaths from pneumonia in Victoria (Australia)
Scottish emigrants to Australia
20th-century Australian musicians
The Masters Apprentices members
20th-century Australian male musicians
Australian male singer-songwriters
Cotton Keays & Morris members